Convoy TM 1 was the code name for an Allied convoy during the Second World War. Nine tankers, escorted by Royal Navy warships, attempted to reach Gibraltar from Trinidad. The convoy was attacked by a U-boat wolf pack in the central Atlantic Ocean, and most of the merchant vessels were sunk. This was one of the most successful attacks on Allied supply convoys throughout the entire war. Seven tankers were sunk during the attacks, two surviving to reach Gibraltar. Two U-boats were damaged during the attacks.

Battle 
 located HMS Godetia on 29 December 1942, escorting two tankers to join up with the main convoy.  made contact with the convoy on 3 January and attacked and damaged the tanker , forcing her crew to abandon her though the ship remained afloat. By now aware that a large tanker convoy was headed through the Atlantic, presumably to deliver supplies to the allied armies in North Africa, Admiral Karl Dönitz, the German BdU (commander in chief of U-Boats) ordered wolf pack "Dolphin" to move into the area and attempt to intercept it.

 made contact with the convoy on 8 January, and the wolf pack launched their first attacks that evening.  attacked and sank  and damaged . Godetia retaliated with depth charges, damaging U-134.

 kept in contact with the convoy, and in the evening of 9 January, U-522 attacked the two tankers she had damaged earlier in the morning, Norvik and Minister Wedel, and sank both of them. Meanwhile, U-442 returned to the damaged and abandoned Empire Lytton and finished her off with two torpedoes, while U-436 returned to the abandoned Albert L. Ellsworth and sank her with shells from her deck gun.  came across , a merchant ship sailing unescorted and not part of convoy TM 1, and sank her.

The attacks resumed on the night of 10/11 January, with U-522 torpedoing . Her crew abandoned her, but the ship was only damaged and did not sink until U-620 arrived and sank her with a coup-de-grace torpedo and gunfire. Other attacks that evening and over the next two days, by U-571 and U-511, fail to score any successes. Supported by allied air cover, the convoy reached Gibraltar without further loss on 14 January. Two tankers, Cliona and Vanja, survived from the original nine.

Order of battle

Merchants

Escorts

U-boats

Wolf pack Dolphin

Others

Notes

References 
 Blair, Clay Hitler's U-Boat War The Hunted 1942–1945 Random House (1998) 
 Darwin, Peter: A Day-By-Day History: World War II, 2007 
 Morison, Samuel Eliot History of United States Naval Operations in World War II (Volume I) The Battle of the Atlantic 1939–1943 Little, Brown and Company, Boston (1947)
 
 U-boat.net

TM001
C